Marvin Lee Wilson (January 5, 1958 – August 7, 2012) was executed by the State of Texas on August 7, 2012, despite experts finding his IQ was 61. Supreme Court rulings subsequent to his execution in 2014 (Hall v. Florida) and 2017 (Moore v. Texas) ruled that the Eighth Amendment protected people with this low of an IQ from being executed under the discretion some states, including Texas, were using at the time. Texas successfully used crime allegation specifics to argue against the expert IQ, but the states are no longer allowed to do that. He entered death row on May 9, 1994, for the murder of a police drug informant who had caught him dealing cocaine. On November 10, 1992, Wilson abducted and shot 21-year-old Jerry Robert Williams following a physical confrontation between the two in the 1500 block of Verone in Beaumont. Wilson then left the body of Williams at a bus stop where it was later found by a bus driver. At the time of the murder, Wilson had two previous convictions for robbery, one of them aggravated.

Wilson's IQ has been claimed to be measured at 61, which meant that he was legally retarded and thus ineligible for execution according to Atkins v. Virginia - a United States Supreme Court ruling against execution of retarded individuals. However, the United States Court of Appeals for the Fifth Circuit originally ruled in December 2005 that due to his lawyer missing a filing deadline, Wilson is unable to file further appeals in federal court.

On March 10, 2006, the Fifth Circuit court granted Wilson permission to file an appeal. In its opinion, the court wrote, "We are satisfied that these are the sort of rare and extraordinary circumstances that justify" waiving the filing deadline.

The National Coalition to Abolish the Death Penalty states that "Wilson’s case illustrates one of the many ways the AEDPA Antiterrorism and Effective Death Penalty Act has severely limited the ability of death row inmates to have their convictions and sentences reviewed to determine if they are being held contrary to the laws of the Constitution."

He was imprisoned as Texas Department of Criminal Justice (TDCJ) inmate #00999098. Wilson was initially located in the Ellis Unit, but was transferred to the Allan B. Polunsky Unit (formerly the Terrell Unit) near Livingston, Texas in 1999. He was executed at Huntsville Unit, Huntsville, Texas.

See also
 List of people executed in Texas, 2010–2019
 List of people executed in the United States in 2012

References

External links
Guardian article
Neuropsychological Report
Statement by Wilson

1958 births
2012 deaths
1992 murders in the United States
American people convicted of robbery
People convicted of murder by Texas
Place of birth missing
People executed by Texas by lethal injection
21st-century executions by Texas
21st-century executions of American people
American people convicted of murder
People executed for murder